Oksefjorden may refer to:

Places
Oksefjorden (Aust-Agder), a fjord in Tvedestrand and Arendal municipalities in Aust-Agder county, Norway
Oksefjorden (Finnmark), a fjord in Lebesby municipality in Finnmark county, Norway
Oksefjorden, also known as the Rivenesfjorden, a fjord in Søgne municipality in Vest-Agder county, Norway

See also
Oksfjorden, a similarly spelled fjord in Troms county, Norway